Kazakhstan sent a delegation to compete at the 2008 Summer Paralympics in Beijing, People's Republic of China.

Sports

Athletics

Powerlifting

Women

Swimming

See also
Kazakhstan at the Paralympics
Kazakhstan at the 2008 Summer Olympics

External links
International Paralympic Committee

Nations at the 2008 Summer Paralympics
2008
Summer Paralympics